Quảng Phúc may refer to several places in Vietnam, including:

 Quảng Phúc, Quảng Bình, a ward of Ba Đồn.
 , a rural commune of Quảng Xương District.